Achi was a small, permanent village on the Tohono Oʼodham Reservation, in Pima County, Arizona United States. As of 2019, there appeared to no longer be any residents or buildings in the village, thus classifying it as a ghost town. The site is approximately one mile northeast of the CDP limits of Santa Rosa. The name "Achi" derives from the Papago word for "ridge."

References

Former populated places in Pima County, Arizona